Lady Bloodfight is a 2016 martial arts film directed by Chris Nahon and starring stuntwoman Amy Johnston as an American fighter who travels to Hong Kong to participate in an all-woman Kumite.

One review noted that the director "keeps the action suitably fast and furious, even if he overly panders to male viewers" by focusing on the often scantily-clad actresses.

Plot
When Jane, a beautiful but troubled American backpacking her way through Hong Kong, successfully fends off three thugs trying to rob her, it draws the attention of Shu, a female fighting champion. Shu recruits and trains Jane to fight in the vicious, all-female underground martial arts tournament known as The Kumite. After months of rigorous training, Jane is ready to face off against her killer rivals, including the apprentice of Shu’s nemesis, a Shaolin master. As other nefarious forces emerge from the shadows, Jane’s journey through The Kumite turns deadly as she risks everything to become the best female fighter in the world.

Cast
Amy Johnston as Jane
Muriel Hofmann as Shu
Jenny Wu as Ling
Kathy Wu as Wai
Jet Tranter as Cassidy
Mayling Ng as Svietta
Sunny Coelst as Jaa
Rosemary Vandebrouck as Yara
Lisa Cheng as Lam
Chalinene Bassinah as Alia
Lauren Rhoden as Van
Lisa Henderson as Natalya
Isa Sofa Chan Kwan Nga as Kim
Nathalie Ng as Aung
Happy Ma as Kazumi
Feng Xiao Xia as Wong
Wing-Hin Ho as Chow
Mon Choi as Lau
Kirt Kishita as Mr. Sang
Joe Fiorello as Gene
Cecilia Reynal as Cooker
Ines Laimins as Mrs. Jones

References

External links
 
 

2016 action films
2016 martial arts films
Hong Kong martial arts films
Martial arts tournament films
Underground fighting films
Sports fiction
Films directed by Chris Nahon
2010s Hong Kong films